Reggie Austin may refer to:

 Reggie Austin (American football) (born 1977), former American football player
 Reggie Austin (actor) (born 1979), American actor